The Hyperboloid of Engineer Garin (translit. Giperboloid inzhenera Garina) also abbreviated as Engineer Garin is a black-and-white 1965 Soviet science fiction film based on Aleksey Tolstoy's novel of the same name.

Awards
IFF of Fantasy Films in Trieste (Italy) – Top Prize "Golden Seal of the City of Trieste", 1966

Cast
Yevgeniy Yevstigneyev as Pyotr Petrovich Garin (Engineer Garin)
Vsevolod Safonov as Vasily Shelga
Mikhail Astangov as Mr. Rolling
Natalya Klimova as Zoya Montrose
Vladimir Druzhnikov as Arthur Levy / Volshin
Mikhail Kuznetsov as Hlynov
Yuri Sarantsev as Tarashkin
Nikolai Bubnov as Nikolai Mantsev
Viktor Chekmaryov as Four-fingered
Pavel Shpringfeld as Gaston / Duck Nose
Bruno O'Ya as Captain Yansen
Alyosha Ushakov as Vanya Gusev
Anatoli Romashin as Dr. Wolf
Valentin Bryleyev as Victor Lenoir
Artyom Karapetyan as secretary
Vyacheslav Gostinsky as comandant of the Golden Island
Stepan Krylov as telegraph worker
Vladimir Balashov as scientist (episode)
Konstantin Karelsky

References

External links

Giperboloid Inzhenera Garina (1965), NYT Movie Review
ГИПЕРБОЛОИД ИНЖЕНЕРА ГАРИНА, DreamTech
Engineer Garin (Giperboloid inzhenera Garina), (RUSICO) Russian Cinema Council
Fedorov, Alexander. “The Hyperboloid of Engineer Garin”: the Novel and its Adaptation to Media Education Lessons in the Student Audience. European Researcher, 2012, Vol.(30), № 9-3, pp.1579-1584

Soviet black-and-white films
Soviet science fiction films
1960s science fiction films
1965 films
1965 in the Soviet Union